The 1977 National League was contested as the second division of Speedway in the United Kingdom.

Summary
Newport had moved down from the British League. Their riders were transferred to Bristol Bulldogs but they acquired new riders and were renamed Newport Dragons. Paisley Lions dropped out so the league had 19 teams, the same as the previous season. Part way through the season, Coatbridge Tigers relocated and changed name to Glasgow Tigers.

Eastbourne Eagles won the National League title, completing a league and cup double. Eastbournes's star rider was Colin Richardson, who won the Riders' Championship and averaged 10.70 for the season. He was backed up by Mike Sampson, who also surpassed a 10 average and Dave Kennett (8.37 average) and a member of Eastbourne's 1971 winning team.

Joe Owen, the leading rider of 1976 had moved from champions Newcastle Diamonds to join British League side Hull Vikings. Newcastle were unable to compensate for the loss and finished in 6th place, despite Joe's brother Tom Owen finishing top of the averages.

Final table

National League Knockout Cup
The 1977 National League Knockout Cup was the tenth edition of the Knockout Cup for tier two teams. Eastbourne Eagles were the winners of the competition.

First round

Second round

Quarter-finals

Semi-finals

Final
First leg

Second leg

Eastbourne were declared Knockout Cup Champions, winning on aggregate 98–57.

Leading final averages

Riders & final averages
Berwick

Graham Jones 7.85
Robin Adlington 7.01
Mike Hiftle 6.65
Willie Templeton 5.76
Dave Gifford 5.69
Terry Kelly 4.44
Keith Williams 4.00
Noel Suckling 3.86
Wayne Brown 3.85
Colin Caffrey 3.47

Boston

Rob Hollingworth 9.90
Carl Glover 7.84
Colin Cook 7.68
Paul Gilbert 7.04
Steve Clarke 6.48
Billy Burton 6.27
Dave Piddock 5.75
Dave Allen 5.45
Stuart Cope 5.37
Ron Cooper 5.25

Canterbury

Steve Koppe 8.83
Graham Banks 8.29
Les Rumsey 8.18
Bob Spelta 7.37
Barney Kennett 6.44
Brendan Shiletto 6.09
Terry Casserley 5.55
Graham Clifton 4.66
Brian Canning 4.32

Coatbridge/Glasgow

Brian Collins 8.94 
Mick McKeon 7.95
Grahame Dawson 7.65
Rob Maxfield 7.13
Derek Richardson 5.41
Merv Janke 4.75
Benny Rourke 4.57
Jimmy Gallacher 4.35
Nicky Hollingworth 2.87

Crayford

Laurie Etheridge 9.41
Alan Sage 8.63
Colin Gooddy 8.53
Alan Johns 5.47
John Hooper 4.63
Mike Bessant 4.18
Richard Davey 4.17
Garry May 3.78

Eastbourne

Colin Richardson 10.63
Mike Sampson 10.09 
Dave Kennett 8.37
Eric Dugard 8.25
Pete Jarman 7.50
Roger Abel 7.32
Paul Woods 6.85
Steve Naylor 6.63

Edinburgh

Bert Harkins 8.09
Jack Millen 7.80
Charlie Monk 7.31
Steve McDermott 6.37
Dave Trownson 6.15
Colin Farquharson 5.75
Alan Bridgett 4.58
Alan Morrison 4.48
Des Allen 3.53

Ellesmere Port

John Jackson 10.07
Steve Finch 8.83
Dave Mortiboys 7.43
Phil Collins 7.23 
Duncan Meredith 5.64 
James Moore 4.93
John Williams 4.90 
Louis Carr 4.03
Paul Sheard 3.20

Mildenhall

Bob Coles 8.81 
Trevor Jones 7.05
Robert Henry 6.66
Mike Spink 6.40
Mick Bates 6.22
Neil Leeks 5.83
John Gibbons 5.66
Fred Mills 5.64
Melvyn Taylor 4.63

Newcastle

Tom Owen 10.82
Robbie Blackadder 8.61 
Ron Henderson 7.72
Phil Kynman 7.22
Robbie Gardner 6.35
Neil Coddington .06
Phil Micheledies 4.75
Eddie Argall 4.43
Rob Maxfield 2.78
Robin Dixon 2.19
Nigel Crabtree 1.47

Newport

Jim Brett 8.84
Brian Woodward 8.31 
John Goodall 7.61 
Mike Broadbank 6.52
Cliff Anderson 5.26
Chris Robins 5.18
Malc Bedkober 5.00
Dave Shepherd 2.88

Oxford

Martin Yeates 10.53 
Phil Bass 7.13
Kevin Young 6.82 
Colin Meredith 6.71
Brian Leonard 6.53
Mick Handley .6.00
Malcolm Holloway 5.90
Pip Lamb 4.99
Gerald Smitherman 3.83
Richie Caulwell 3.31

Peterborough

Andy Hines 7.83
Ian Clark 7.47
Kevin Hawkins 7.37
Nigel Flatman 7.00
Brian Clark 6.99
Nigel Couzens 6.46
Ken Matthews 6.26 
Peter Spink 4.33

Rye House

Kelvin Mullarkey 9.14 
Ted Hubbard 9.02 
Bobby Garrad 8.07
Hugh Saunders 7.32 
Karl Fiala 6.22
Ashley Pullen 6.11
Peter Tarrant 6.00
Bob Cooper 4.79

Scunthorpe

Nicky Allott 8.29 
Arthur Browning 7.69
John McNeil 7.22 
Sid Sheldrick 5.86
Dave Baugh 5.76
Trevor Whiting 5.09
Paul Cooper 4.80
Phil White 4.75
Danny Young 4.21

Stoke

Stuart Mountford 8.15
Tim Nunan 7.3
Ian Gledhill 6.67
Carl Askew 6.49
Ian Robertson 6.26
Mick Fishwick 5.65
Steve McDermott 5.29
Rob Dole 4.50
Colin Farquharson 4.11
Ian Jeffcoate 3.86
Trevor Vincent/Charley 3.37

Teesside
 
Alan Emerson 8.56
Steve Wilcock 6.84 
Pete Reading 6.16
Pete Smith 6.09
Nigel Close 5.14
Martyn Cusworth 4.95
John Robson 4.80
Mike Beaumont 4.67
Harry MacLean 2.56

Weymouth

Danny Kennedy 8.65
Vic Harding 7.95
Malcolm Corradine 7.91
Chris Robins 6.14
Sean Willmott 5.65
Rob Jones 5.59
Geoff Swindells 5.27
Richard Evans 5.24
Chris Julian 4.77
Roger Stratton 4.58

Workington

Steve Lawson 8.19
Brian Havelock 7.82
Mick Newton 6.47
Ian Hindle 6.37
Roger Wright 5.61
Colin Goad 5.49
Terry Kelly 4.65
Mark Dickinson 3.14
Chris Bevan 3.04
Andy Reid 3.04

See also
List of United Kingdom Speedway League Champions
Knockout Cup (speedway)

References

Speedway British League Division Two / National League